The Michigan Motor Sports Hall of Fame is a non-profit hall of fame for Michigan auto racers.

It was founded in 1982 by Dick Lee and was incorporated April 19, 1982, as a non-profit 501(c) (3) non-stock Michigan corporation.

The Michigan Motor Sports Hall of Fame display is currently located at the Gilmore Car Museum in Hickory Corners. It is in conjunction with their "History of Stock Car Racing" display.

The Michigan Motor Sports Hall of Fame exhibit was located at the R. E. Olds Transportation Museum in Lansing from 1994 thru 2006.

Mission statement 
The initiation of the Michigan Motor Sports Hall of Fame was to:
Preserve the history of all types of motor racing in the state of Michigan, and make this history available to the public.
Recognize and pay tribute to those citizens of Michigan who have given of themselves, whatever their roles in racing may have been.
Enshrine and acknowledge the deeds of those people that excelled in motor sports.
Have a permanent museum where the public can examine motor sports racing memorabilia and recognize those who have been enshrined.

Organization 
Michigan Motor Sports Hall of Fame is governed by a Board of Directors, President, Vice President, Treasurer, Corresponding Secretary coupled with several Standing Committees.

Board members 

Marty Blume - Rives Junction, MI
Roger Britt - Augres, MI
Allan E. Brown - Comstock, MI (Treasurer)
Rose Calabrase - Lansing, MI
Dan Crawford - St. Charles, MI (Vice President)
Dave DeHam - Harrison Twp., MI
Terry Fitzwater - Eaton Rapids, MI
Darcie Fuzi - Gaylord, MI (Secretary)
Duane Hernly - Lansing, MI
Tom Hernly - Lansing, MI 
Don Holben - Lansing, MI
Wayne Landon - Freeport, MI
Dave Lehman - Hastings, MI
Jack McCourtie - Jackson, MI
Barry Meschke - Saginaw, MI
Jim Pape - Saginaw, MI
Leo Pego - Mt. Pleasant, MI
Dan VanKoevering - Grand Rapids, MI (President)

Biography submittals 
Bios can be submitted either digitally by email or sent via USPS to the address listed on the Michigan Motor Sports Hall of Fame website

All nominee candidates must have started their racing career 25 years prior to being submitted for consideration. The candidate has to be a past or present legal resident of Michigan, or, if a non-resident, competed the vast majority of their career within the State of Michigan.

The Michigan Motor Sports Hall of Fame Board appreciates and welcomes all legitimate biography submittals.

The voting process involves all living inductees, and all past and present board members. Over 100 persons are eligible for the sealed ballot voting.

List of inductees 

 = Deceased
A
 Jim Adema - inducted 1988
Ricky D. Adkins - inducted 2014
Jim Aldrich - inducted 1994
Bruce Allen - inducted 2005
Fred Alter - inducted 2013
Steve Ambrose - inducted 2012
 John Anderson - inducted 2002
Bob Andrews - inducted 2002
 Leo Anthony - inducted 2013
 Reynald Argenta - inducted 2012
Jerry Arnold - inducted 1998
 Sam Ash - inducted 1992
B
Ralph Baker - inducted 1993
 Ray Baker - inducted 2001
 Henry Banks - inducted 1982
 Erv Baumgarten - inducted 2013
 Ernie Beckman - inducted 2011
 Dick Beebe - inducted 1985
 Pat Beebe - inducted 1998
 Paul Beebe - inducted 1985
Bob Benner - inducted 2009
Art Bennett - inducted 1986
John Benson, Sr. - inducted 1986
Al Bergler - inducted 2006
Dennis Berry - inducted 2012
 Al Blixt, Sr. - inducted 2014
Jeff Bloom - inducted 2000
Dave Boertman - inducted 1990
 Tom Bowles - inducted 2003
 Bill Boyd - inducted 1989
Andy Bozell - inducted 2007
Tony Brabbs - inducted 2010
 Bob Bracey - inducted 2014
 Art Braithwaite - inducted 1988
Lee Brayton - inducted 1998
 Scott Brayton - inducted 1998
Vic Brinkman - inducted 2003
Allan E. Brown - inducted 2011
Norm Brown - inducted 1987
 Clifford 'Porky' Burkholder - inducted 2001
 Bob Burman - inducted 1983
Danny Byrd - inducted 2003
C
Jack Calabrase - inducted 1993
Fred Campbell - inducted 1998
 Canfield & Johnson - inducted 2005
Marv Carman - inducted 2011
Bob Carnes - inducted 1995
 Dick Carter - inducted 1983
Neal Carter - inducted 1997
 Dennis Casteele - inducted 2005
 Jack Caswell - inducted 1992
Chevair Racing Team - inducted 1996
 Louis Chevrolet - inducted 1984
 Bob Clover - inducted 2001
Gail Cobb - inducted 1999
Gene Coleman - inducted 2008
 Ken Coles - inducted 1987
Jack Conely - inducted 1987
Dan Crawford - inducted 2009
 Jack Cummiford - inducted 1996
D
Tom D'Eath - inducted 1998
 Ray Daniels - inducted 2001
 Bob Davis - inducted 1995
Dick Decker - inducted 2005
Dick DeGraw  - inducted 2012
Russ Densmore - inducted 2012
Tom DeVette - inducted 2013
Jack Doering - inducted 1987
John Doering, Jr. - inducted 2011
Denny Donaldson - inducted 1997
Ralph Donaldson - inducted 1987
Harry Doolittle - inducted 2004
Joe Dorer - inducted 2006
Butch Dowker - inducted 2010
 Max Dowker - inducted 1984
Ron Drager - inducted 2007
 Ronnie Duman - inducted 1985
 Hank Dumon - inducted 1995
Dick Dunshee - inducted 2013
E
Tom Earhart - inducted 1990
Mike Eddy - inducted 1995
F
Harold Fair, Sr. - inducted 1996
 Joy Fair - inducted 1986
Cy Fairchild - inducted 1988
Butch Fedewa - inducted 1993
Gary Fedewa - inducted 1992
Tim Fedewa - inducted 2014
 Wilson Fedewa - inducted 1982
 John Fedricks - inducted 1999
Timothy Felver - inducted 2005
Bob Finley - inducted 2006
Doug Finley - inducted 2011
Jeff Finley - inducted 2010
Doug Flannery - inducted 2011
Bob Flinn - inducted 2012
Ron Flinn - inducted 2007
Mike Fons - inducted 2006
Harry Foote, Jr. - inducted 2008
 Harry Foote, Sr. - inducted 2014
 Carl Forberg - inducted 1985
 Henry Ford - inducted 1984
 Spencer Foreman - inducted 1994
 Danny Foster - inducted 1999
 Jim Frankland, Jr. - inducted 1995
 Louie Freeburn - inducted 1995
 Vern 'Flip' Fritch - inducted 1982
G
Chuck Gallagher - inducted 2000
Mike Garvey - inducted 2005
Paul Gentilozzi - inducted 1998
Sam Gianino - inducted 2007
 Bob Gillelan - inducted 2008
Mel Gillett - inducted 2006
Roger Gilligan - inducted 1986
 Jim Gilmore, Jr. - inducted 1989
Duane Glasgow - inducted 1996
Paul Goldsmith - inducted 1986
Jack Goodwin - inducted 1984
 Leo Goossen - inducted 1985
 John Gordenski - inducted 1986
 Owen Granger, Sr. - inducted 1992
John Grega - inducted 2003
John Grivins - inducted 2004
H
 John Haas - inducted 2010
Henry A Haigh II - inducted 1997
 Al Hall - inducted 1996
Sonny Hall - inducted 2014
Bill Hanes - inducted 1995
Bob Hanes - inducted 2007
 Sam Hanks - inducted 1984
Dr. Richard Harris - inducted 1997
 Rondie Harris - inducted 1988
 Ray Harroun - inducted 2010
 Bill Heeney, Sr. - inducted 2002
Kevin Helms - inducted 2013
Ron Hemelgarn - inducted 2013
 Gene Henderson - inducted 1989
Jim Hettinger - inducted 1998
Team Highland - inducted 1992
Don Holben - inducted 2007
Bob Holly - inducted 2013
 Ronney Householder - inducted 1983
Chas Howe - inducted 2014
Ed Howe - inducted 1988
Jay Howell - inducted 2008
Bob Huettman - inducted 2012
 Harvey Hughes - inducted 2008
 Roger Huntington - inducted 1997
I
 Bob Iverson - inducted 2000
J
 Jake Jacobson - inducted 1986
Russ Jacobson - inducted 1990
Gordon Johncock - inducted 1985
 Nolan Johncock - inducted 1989
Danny Johnson - inducted 2006
 Johnny Johnson - inducted 1989
 Ed Jones - inducted 1983
 Harry Jones - inducted 2008
 Roger Joneson - inducted 1987
K
Doug Kahl - inducted 1995
Connie Kalitta - inducted 1986
Doug Kalitta - inducted 2011
 Scott Kalitta - inducted 2011
 Bert Karnatz - inducted 1993
 Mickey Katlin - inducted 1990
 Iggy Katona - inducted 1982
 Ron Keech - inducted 1994
 Curt Kelley - inducted 2005
 Rusty Kelley - inducted 2007
The Keselowski Family - inducted 2004
 Tom Kestenholtz - inducted 2004
Bob Kingen - inducted 1993
 Bob Knight - inducted 1992
Duane Knoll - inducted 1999
Todd Krikke - inducted 2006
Dave Kuhlman - inducted 2006
 Frank Kulick - inducted 1992
L
Dick LaHaie - inducted 1993
Frank Lamp - inducted 2009
 Jerry Landon - inducted 1991
Wayne Landon - inducted 1985
George Lane - inducted 2001
 Tommy Lane - inducted 1984
 Jack Layton - inducted 2000
 Jim & Mary Jo Ledford - inducted 1999
Dick Lee - inducted 2002
 Bob Lewis - inducted 1986
Gary Lindahl - inducted 2004
 Bud Lindemann - inducted 1991
 Jack Lindhout - inducted 1994
 Johnny Logan - inducted 1986
 Eugene Logghe - inducted 2010
 Ronald Logghe - inducted 2010
Gary Long - inducted 2008
Vito LoPiccolo - inducted 2006
Hank Lower - inducted 1996
Jon W. Lundberg, Sr. - inducted 1997
 Frank Luptow - inducted 1988
M
Ken Mackey - inducted 2007
Tom Maier - inducted 1993
Jerry Makara - inducted 2011
 John Marcum - inducted 1982
 Mildred Marcum - inducted 2000
 Bart Markel - inducted 1986
 James 'Hammer' Mason - inducted 1986
Larry McCloskey - inducted 2002
 Chuck McClung - inducted 1989
Jack McCormack - inducted 2000
Jack McCourtie - inducted 2006
Don McElroy - inducted 2013
 Bill McGowan - inducted 2012
Rod McLean - inducted 1999
 Harry Melling - inducted 2004
Paul Mercure - inducted 2003
Jimmy Meyer - inducted 1998
 Al Miller - inducted 1990
Diane Miller - inducted 2010
Henry 'Butch' Miller - inducted 1997
Dave Mulder - inducted 2002
Shirley Muldowney - inducted 1989
 Bill Muncey - inducted 1995
 Jimmy Murphy - inducted 1989
Brian Musselman - inducted 2002
 Glen A. Myers - inducted 1997
 Chet Mysliwiec - inducted 1984
N
Bill Naida - inducted 1987
John Naida - inducted 1996
 Duke Nalon - inducted 1986
 Ray Nece - inducted 1989
 Jim Nelson - inducted 1989
 Jack Nichols - inducted 1995
Tim Norman - inducted 2012
O
 Harry Obie - inducted 1995
 Barney Oldfield - inducted 1985
Bill Owen - inducted 2009
P
Scott Parker - inducted 2004
Ray Paquet - inducted 2010
 Benny Parsons - inducted 1988
Pat Patrick - inducted 1990
Bob Patterson - inducted 1999
Kris Patterson - inducted 2000
Marv Parenteau - inducted 2014
Leo Pego - inducted 2008
 Neil Penny - inducted 2004
Roger Penske - inducted 1994
 Marvin Pifer, Sr. - inducted 1984
 Setto Postoian - inducted 1997
 E.J. Potter - inducted 1992
 Norm Power - inducted 1986
 Hod Preston - inducted 1987
Al Provoast - inducted 2001
Q
R
The Ramchargers - inducted 1996
Benny Rapp - inducted 1991
Bill Reichert - inducted 2002
Dewey Rethman - inducted 2009
 Harold Reynolds - inducted 2005
 Charles Rhodes - inducted 1989
Kim (LaHaie) Richards - inducted 2014
 Johnny Ritter - inducted 1989
Donnie Roberts - inducted 2005
 Jimmy Roberts - inducted 1999
 Johnny Roberts - inducted 1983
 Lyle Roberts - inducted 1999
 Glen Rockey - inducted 1987
 Ray Rogers - inducted 1992
 Mauri Rose, Sr. - inducted 1982
 "Wild" Willie Rose - inducted 2013
The Ross Brothers - inducted 2008
Dick Ross - inducted 1987
Chuck Roumell - inducted 2014
Jack Roush - inducted 1992
Rock Running - inducted 2002
Maynard Rupp, Jr. - inducted 2001
Norm Rust - inducted 2000
 Marion 'Babe' Ruth - inducted 1992
Joe Ruttman - inducted 1989
 Troy Ruttman, Sr. - inducted 1982
S
 Eddie Sachs II - inducted 1991
Wally Sanders - inducted 2000
Steve Sauve - inducted 2003
 Sam Sayer - inducted 1991
 Carl Scarborough - inducted 1985
 J.Lee Schoenith - inducted 2000
 Mick Schuler - inducted 2000
Karl Schwartz - inducted 2012
Frank Seder - inducted 2008
Bob Seelman, Sr. - inducted 1990
Bob Seibert - inducted 2002
Bob Senneker - inducted 1988
 Rich Senneker - inducted 2000
 Sammy Sessions - inducted 1982
Larry Shepard - inducted 2009
 John Shipman - inducted 1994
 Joan Simmons - inducted 2011
'Lil Richard Simmons - inducted 1993
 Al Singer - inducted 1985
Odie Skeen - inducted 2014
Dick Slade - inducted 2001
Jim Slade - inducted 2010
 Doc Smalley - inducted 2006
 Bob Snelenberger - inducted 1988
 Russ Snowberger - inducted 1990
Bob Snyder - inducted 2003
Artie Sommers - inducted 2007
Jay Springsteen - inducted 1993
 Clare Stader - inducted 1983
Tim Steele - inducted 2009
 Elmer Stevens - inducted 1994
 Buddy Stewart - inducted 2001
Rick Stout - inducted 2009
Tom Straley - inducted 2007
Bob Studt - inducted 2001
 Donnell Sullivan - inducted 1986
Randy Sweet - inducted 1997
T
Mark Tate - inducted 2005
Don Taylor - inducted 1993
Dutch Taylor - inducted 2006
 John Tenney - inducted 2004
Jim Terill - inducted 2012
Mason Thomas - inducted 1985
LeRoy Throop - inducted 2003
Bill Tyler - inducted 2001
Brian Tyler - inducted 2007
U
 Emil Ujlaky - inducted 1993
V
The Vakula Family - inducted 2012
Bruce VanderLaan - inducted 2004
 Eddie VanderLaan - inducted 1993
 Gordy VanderLaan - inducted 1986
 Bill VandeWater - inducted 1987
 Ed & Carmen VanDuinen - inducted 2010
 Charley Voelker - inducted 1982
Donald R Voisin - inducted 2009
W
 Bill Waddill - inducted 1991
 Nelson Ward - inducted 1984
Mark Weber - inducted 2014
Pete Webster - inducted 1988
 Lew Welch - inducted 1982
Ben & Dave Wenzel - inducted 2000
Chris White - inducted 1996
 Chuck White - inducted 1989
 Johnny White - inducted 1985
Bill Whittington - inducted 2005
 Willie Wik - inducted 1998
 Les Williams - inducted 1994
 Bill Wiltse - inducted 1985
Roger Wing - inducted 2004
 Johnny Wohlfeil, Sr. - inducted 1984
 Gar Wood - inducted 1990
 Vicki Wood - inducted 2019
Della Woods - inducted 1999
Jay Woolworth - inducted 2003
X
Y
 Stan Yee, Sr. - inducted 2009
Z
 Eddie Zalucki, Sr. - inducted 1984
 Carson Zeiter - inducted 1984
 Dick Zimmerman - inducted 1987
 Paul Zimmerman - inducted 2002

References 
 Michigan Motor Sports Hall of Fame

External links 
 Michigan Motor Sports Hall of Fame website

Halls of fame in Michigan
Auto racing museums and halls of fame